Hartling is a surname. Notable people with the surname include:

 Carlos Hartling (1869–1920), German-born composer from Honduras
 Nancy Hartling (born 1950), Canadian politician
 Nicolai Hartling (born 1994), Danish hurdler
 Poul Hartling (1914–2000), Danish diplomat and politician
 Peter Härtling (born 1933), German writer and poet

See also 
 Hartling, synonym for red grape variety Cabernet Franc